Masoud Keshmiri was a member of the People's Mujahedin of Iran (MEK) who infiltrated the Islamic Republican Party (IRP) and came up through the ranks, reaching the position of secretary of the Supreme National Security Council, before planting an incendiary bomb in his briefcase that blew up the Prime Minister's office in 1981. Victims of the explosion were President Mohammad-Ali Rajaei and Prime Minister Mohammad-Javad Bahonar among others.

At first, it was thought that Keshmiri himself died in the explosion, however it was later revealed that he slipped through the dragnet.

See also
List of fugitives from justice who disappeared

References 

Bombers (people)
Entryists
Fugitives
Fugitives wanted by Iran
Islamic Republican Party politicians
People's Mojahedin Organization of Iran members
Possibly living people